Trichomycterus pirabitira is a species of pencil catfish described from tributaries of the upper rio Grande, rio Paraná basin, southeastern Brazil.  The maximum recorded length for this species is  SL.

References

External links

pirabitira
Fish of South America
Fish of Brazil
Fish described in 2012